The  is a ridge walk as well as an historical boundary path in the Thuringian Forest, Thuringian Highland and Franconian Forest in Central Germany.

Route

The  runs along the ridge of the Thuringian Central Uplands from northwest to southeast mostly at heights of around 500 to 970 metres. The marking along the trail is very good, usually indicated by a white 'R' (called ). Along the  there are small, open shelters about every 5 to 10 kilometres.

The tunnel was opened in 2003 as a motorway tunnel for the A 71 autobahn. The vertical height difference between the two tunnels is less than seven metres.

Districts along the 

Towns and villages

History

First record and meaning of the name
Etymologists are inconclusive about the origin of its name.

In addition to the well-known  trail itself, there are about 250 other "" and "" in German-speaking countries. Some of these are older and some more recent than that of the Thuringian Forest. This casts doubt upon its meaning as a genuine boundary path.

Middle Ages
Throughout the Middle Ages, the  marked the boundary of the Duchy of Franconia with the Landgraviate of Thuringia. Even today it forms a clear border between the Franconian part of South Thuringia from the otherwise Thuringian–Upper Saxon lands of Thuringia. The  as a language border separates the East Franconian dialects (and Upper Franconian) from the Thuringian dialects (Central Thuringian,  Thuringian and Southeastern Thuringian) spoken in the mountains, in the northern part and east of the Thuringian Forest.

Modern era
The hiking trail was first described and mapped by the cartographer  (1791–1858) in his 1832 book . In July 1889 the author  (1851–1919) hiked along the  ridge and published his book  the next year, whereafter the trail became famous well beyond the borders of Thuringia and Franconia mainly through the publications of the  Club founded in 1896. The  is a wandering song written in 1951, that symbolises the spirit of the Thuringian people.

After World War II, the trail was not completely passable as it crossed the inner German border several times. After the Peaceful Revolution of 1989, it was officially reopened on 28 April 1990. In Thuringia, the trail was declared a heritage site in 1997

Rennsteig stones

Along the  there are about 1,300 historic boundary stones. The boundary stones surviving today stem mainly from the 18th century. In addition to boundary stones, there are also forest stones, stone crosses and monuments along the trail.

In  during the GDR period, there was a hotel (later demolished) of the same name in the shape of a boundary stone.

trail
The  Cycle Path was opened on 19 June 2000. Most of it is provided with a water-bound surface, some sections also run along quiet country lanes. Here and there it departs from the course of the historic , so that steep inclines may be avoided. It is therefore about 30 km longer than the hiking trail.

The  is connected to the E3 European long distance path, which goes from the Atlantic coast of Spain to the Black Sea coast of Bulgaria, and the E6 European long distance path, running from Arctic Finland to Turkey.

Transport
The  Railway running to  station near  is a branch line, that has not been regularly used by passenger trains since 1998.

Rennsteig Run
With more than 14,000 participating runners and walkers it is one of the largest events of its type in Europe.

Literature

References

External links

  blog
 http://www.rennsteigtip.de 
  – Information about the 

Thuringian Forest
Hiking trails in Germany